Panther in the Basement is a 1995 novel by Israeli author Amos Oz, published in English translation in 1998.

Plot
Oz's reminiscent novel describes the doings of a twelve-year-old boy in 1947, the last year of the British Mandate of Palestine, during the British–Zionist conflict. Young Proffy has organized a pro-Israel underground cell that proposes to blow up Buckingham Palace or perhaps 10 Downing Street. These heroic dreams are no danger to anybody, but Proffy's friendship with a kindly British soldier causes his two fellow panthers to accuse him of treason.

Film
The film The Little Traitor (2007), starring Alfred Molina, is based on the book.

External links

20th-century Israeli novels
1998 novels
Novels by Amos Oz
Fiction set in 1947
Novels set in Israel
Israeli novels adapted into films